Tamarac is a city in Broward County, Florida, United States. At the 2020 census, the city had a population of 71,897. It is part of the Miami metropolitan area, which was home to an estimated 6,012,331 people in 2015.

History

In the early 1960s a young developer named Ken Behring came from the Midwest and bought land where he could, creating an active adult community of two-bedroom maintenance-free homes.  He called his new city Tamarac, named after the nearby Tamarac Country Club in Oakland Park.

In 1963, Behring built and Jesse Pilch sold the city's first development east of State Road 7, Tamarac Lakes Section One and Section Two. Next came two neighborhoods of homes built on a former orange grove called Tamarac Lakes North and Tamarac Lakes Boulevard. Four of Behring's last developments were Tamarac Lakes South, then the Mainlands of Tamarac Lakes just west of State Road 7, and finally the Woodlands community.

The city's early leaders, hoping to preserve Tamarac as a bedroom community, allowed Fort Lauderdale to annex commercial pockets, forever losing land that might have bolstered the city's coffers. In the late 1970s, the city de-annexed a long line of commercial buildings from State Road 7 all the way to Northwest 31 Avenue, but it went along with Behring's vision of Tamarac as a bedroom community. The boundaries were wherever Behring decided to build homes. The city's current eastern boundaries narrow to a sliver from Northwest 31 to 37 Avenues, then widen to the south. The city's easternmost boundary extends below Commercial Boulevard to Northwest 16 Avenue.  City officials had once considered revising their east city limit lines to ensure efficient delivery of government services.

Behring also named a subdivision he built in the Pinellas Park area, the "Mainlands of Tamarac By-the-Gulf".

Geography

Tamarac is located at  (26.203581, –80.246376).

Demographics

2020 census

As of the 2020 United States census, there were 71,897 people, 26,124 households, and 14,906 families residing in the city.

2010 census

As of 2010, there were 32,794 households, with 13.4% being vacant. In 2000, 15.4% had children under the age of 18 living with them, 44.8% were married couples living together, 9.4% had a female householder with no husband present, and 42.6% were non-families. 36.3% of all households were made up of individuals, and 23.0% had someone living alone who was 65 years of age or older. The average household size was 2.00 and the average family size was 2.56.

2000 census
In 2000, the city the population was spread out, with 13.4% under the age of 18, 5.3% from 18 to 24, 23.5% from 25 to 44, 20.1% from 45 to 64, and 37.8% who were 65 years of age or older.  The median age was 53 years. For every 100 females, there were 80.9 males.  For every 100 females age 18 and over, there were 77.3 males.

In 2000, the median income for a household in the city was $34,290, and the median income for a family was $41,927. Males had a median income of $32,317 versus $28,360 for females. The per capita income for the city was $22,243.  About 6.1% of families and 8.9% of the population were below the poverty line, including 13.5% of those under age 18 and 7.2% of those age 65 or over.

As of 2000, speakers of English language as a first language were at 78.08% of the population, while Spanish was at 13.69%. Also, Yiddish was at 1.90%, French at 1.15%, Haitian Creole consisted of 1.12%, Italian made up 1.08%, German comprised 0.62%, and Hebrew as a mother tongue made up 0.52% of residents.

Over the years, the multicultural population has expanded in Tamarac, such as people from Latin American and Caribbean ancestry. As of 2000, Tamarac was the fifty-first-most Colombian-populated area in the U.S., with 2.74% of the population. It also had the thirty-second-highest percentage of Jamaicans in the U.S., (tied with Royal Palm Beach and Goulds) at 4.1% of all residents.

Education

Broward County Public Schools operates public schools.

Elementary schools in the Tamarac city limits include:
 Challenger Elementary School
 Tamarac Elementary School

Other elementary schools serving sections of Tamarac include Discovery (Sunrise), Pinewood (North Lauderdale), Park Lakes (Lauderdale Lakes), Oriole (Lauderdale Lakes), and Lloyd Estates (Oakland Park).

Millennium 6–12 Collegiate Academy is the sole public secondary school in Tamarac; it was previously only a middle school, but its high school began operations in 2017. Tamarac has a middle school attendance zone serving the majority of the city (sections of the city limits west of NW 81 Avenue). High school students are not zoned to Tamarac; preference is given to those who attended Millennium middle, and those wishing to attend the high school must be eligible for dual-enrollment with Broward College. Other sections are served by Silver Lakes Middle in North Lauderdale, Lauderdale Lakes Middle in Lauderdale Lakes. and Rickards Middle in Oakland Park.

Much of Tamarac is zoned to J. P. Taravella High School in Coral Springs, and Piper High School in Sunrise, with Taravella serving northern areas and Piper serving southern areas. Other sections are assigned to Boyd H. Anderson High School in Lauderdale Lakes and Northeast High School in Oakland Park.

The Roman Catholic Archdiocese of Miami previously operated Saint Malachy School in Tamarac.

References

External links
 

Tamarac, Florida at City-Data.com
Tamarac Historical Society

Cities in Broward County, Florida
Cities in Florida
1963 establishments in Florida
Populated places established in 1963